The girls' ski cross event at the 2016 Winter Youth  Olympics took place on 15 February at the Hafjell Freepark.

Results

Qualification

Group heats

Semifinals
Heat 1

Heat 2

Finals
Small final

Big final

References

External links
Qualification results
Bracket
 

Freestyle skiing at the 2016 Winter Youth Olympics